Pyrazoline is a heterocyclic chemical compound with the molecular formula C3H6N2.